Ombersley and Doverdale is an area in Wychavon district, Worcestershire, England served by a single parish council but comprising the two separate civil parishes of Ombersley and Doverdale. 

The parish council website, states that "combining of the Parishes of Ombersley and Doverdale in 1973 created one of the largest parishes in Worcestershire", and the Neighbourhood Development Plan refers (eg page 5) to "the parish of Ombersley and Doverdale", but other sources - Office for National Statistics, Ordnance Survey, MapIt,  NHLE - indicate that the two parishes still exist as separate entities.

References

 
Wychavon
Local government in Worcestershire